This is a list of schools in Bournemouth, Christchurch and Poole in the English county of Dorset.

State-funded schools

Primary schools

 Ad Astra Infant School, Canford Heath
 Avonwood Primary School, Bournemouth
 Baden-Powell and St Peters CE Junior School, Parkstone
 Bayside Academy, Hamworthy
 Bearwood Primary School, Bearwood
 Bethany CE Junior School, Boscombe
 Bishop Aldhelm's CE Primary School, Branksome
 Branksome Heath Junior School, Poole
 Broadstone First School, Broadstone
 Burton CE Primary School, Burton
 Canford Heath Infant School, Canford Heath
 Canford Heath Junior School, Canford Heath
 Christ The King RC Primary School, Kinson
 Christchurch Infant School, Christchurch
 Christchurch Junior School, Christchurch
 Corpus Christi RC Primary School, Boscombe
 Courthill Infant School, Parkstone
 Elm Academy, Bournemouth
 The Epiphany School, Bournemouth
 Hamworthy Park Junior School, Hamworthy
 Heatherlands Primary School, Parkstone
 Heathlands Primary Academy, Bournemouth
 Highcliffe St Mark Primary School, Highcliffe
 Hill View Primary School, Ensbury Park
 Hillbourne Primary School, Waterloo
 Jewell Academy, Bournemouth
 King's Park Academy, Boscombe
 Kingsleigh Primary School, Bournemouth
 Kinson Academy, Kinson
 Lilliput CE Infant School, Lilliput
 Livingstone Academy, Bournemouth
 Livingstone Road Infant School, Parkstone
 Livingstone Road Junior School, Parkstone
 Longfleet CE Primary School, Longfleet
 Malmesbury Park Primary School, Bournemouth
 Manorside Academy, Parkstone
 Merley First School, Merley
 Moordown St John's CE Primary School, Bournemouth
 Mudeford Community Infants' School, Mudeford
 Mudeford Junior School, Mudeford
 Muscliff Primary School, Throop
 Oakdale Junior School, Oakdale
 Ocean Academy, Poole
 Old Town Infant School, Poole
 Parkfield School, Hurn
 Pokesdown Community Primary School, Bournemouth
 The Priory CE Primary School, Christchurch
 Queens Park Infant Academy, Bournemouth
 Queens Park Junior Academy, Bournemouth
 St Clement's and St John's CE Infant School, Boscombe
 St James' CE Primary Academy, Bournemouth
 St Joseph's RC Primary School, Parkstone
 St Joseph's RC Primary School, Somerford
 St Katharine's CE Primary School, Southbourne
 St Luke's CE Primary School, Winton
 St Mark's CE Primary School, Talbot Village
 St Mary's RC Primary School, Oakdale
 St Michael's CE Primary School, Bournemouth
 St Peter's RC School, Bournemouth
 St Walburga's RC Primary School, Bournemouth
 Somerford Primary School, Somerford
 Springdale First School, Broadstone
 Stanley Green Infant Academy, Oakdale
 Stourfield Infant School, Southbourne
 Stourfield Junior School, Southbourne
 Talbot Primary School, Wallisdown
 Twin Sails Infant School, Hamworthy
 Twynham Primary School, Christchurch
 Winton Primary School, Ensbury Park

Middle schools
 Broadstone Middle School, Broadstone

Non-selective secondary schools

 Avonbourne Boys' Academy, Littledown
 Avonbourne Girls' Academy, Littledown
 The Bishop of Winchester Academy, Charminster
 The Bourne Academy, East Howe
 Corfe Hills School, Broadstone
 The Cornerstone Academy, Hamworthy
 Glenmoor Academy, Ensbury Park
 The Grange School, Christchurch
 Highcliffe School, Highcliffe
 LeAF Studio, West Howe
 Livingstone Academy, Bournemouth
 Magna Academy, Canford Heath
 Oak Academy, West Howe
 Parkfield School, Hurn
 Poole High School, Oakdale
 St Aldhelm's Academy, Parkstone
 St Edward's RC CE School, Oakdale
 St Peter's RC School, Southbourne
 Twynham School, Christchurch
 Winton Academy, Ensbury Park

Grammar schools
 Bournemouth School, Charminster
 Bournemouth School for Girls, Charminster
 Parkstone Grammar School, Waterloo
 Poole Grammar School, Broadstone/Canford Heath

Special and alternative schools
 Christchurch Learning Centre, Christchurch
 Linwood School, Winton
 Longspee School, Canford Heath
 Montacute School, Canford Heath
 The Quay School, Parkstone
 Tregonwell Academy, Bournemouth
 Winchelsea School, Parkstone

Further education
 Bournemouth Academy of Modern Music
The Bournemouth and Poole College

Independent schools

Primary and preparatory schools
 Park School, Bournemouth
 St Martin's School, Bournemouth
 St Thomas Garnet's School, Boscombe
 Talbot House School, Winton

Senior and all-through schools
 Bournemouth Christian School, Bournemouth
 Bournemouth Collegiate School, Parkstone/Southbourne
 Canford School, Canford Magna
 Kings Bournemouth, Bournemouth
 Talbot Heath School, Bournemouth

Special and alternative schools
 Connie Rothman Learning Centre, Southbourne
 Langside School, Poole
 The Lion Works School, Poole
 Portfield School, Christchurch
 The Stable School, Christchurch
 Victoria Education Centre, Branksome Park

 
Bournemouth, Christchurch and Poole